Dolores Beristáin (1926–2010) was a Mexican actress. She appeared in a variety of film and television roles from 1970 until 1999.

External links

1926 births
2010 deaths
20th-century Mexican actresses
Mexican television actresses